The 1985 South African Grand Prix was a Formula One motor race held on 19 October 1985 at the Kyalami Circuit in South Africa. It was the fifteenth and penultimate round of the 1985 FIA Formula One World Championship.

The race was marked with some teams boycotting the event due to apartheid – the segregation of blacks and whites – and was the last South African Formula One race until apartheid ended in 1992. The race was won by Nigel Mansell in a Williams-Honda, who also took pole position.

Report
This was the last World Championship Grand Prix to be held on a Saturday (the Las Vegas Grand Prix is due to be held on a Saturday in 2023), and the last World Championship Grand Prix where laurel wreaths were given to the drivers at the podium. The event was boycotted by two teams, Ligier and Renault, owing to mounting international pressures against tolerating the country's system of apartheid. A state of emergency had been declared by the South African government in July due to growing civil unrest nationwide, and French teams Ligier and Renault's boycotts were in lockstep with the French government's boycott and sanctioning of South Africa, apparently doing so under pressure. Most of the Formula One drivers, including Alain Prost, Niki Lauda and Nigel Mansell were personally very much against racing in South Africa, but the drivers held the mentality that because they were contracted to drive at every Grand Prix, they would race at Kyalami.

Some governments tried to keep their drivers from entering the race. Brazil's sanctions on South Africa nearly prevented Nelson Piquet or Ayrton Senna from racing.

Finland and Sweden held similar reservations regarding Finn Keke Rosberg and Swede Stefan Johansson competing. Sweden's National Automobile Federation had announced Johansson could not race in South Africa before the event, but he did race.

Ayrton Senna initially said he would race if Lotus raced. However, he later said he would boycott the race.

Multiple sponsors also ordered teams to remove their branding from cars they backed, most notably Marlboro and Beatrice Foods.

The latter held an equity interest in the single car Haas Lola team. While Alan Jones qualified 18th for that team, his car was not on the starting grid. Officially Jones cited illness as to why he did not race, but it was widely rumored at the time that Beatrice ordered the team to boycott. In 2017, Jones described a meeting with Bernie Ecclestone the night before the race, who suggested that Jones feign illness the next morning and not show up. Ecclestone described how Beatrice were under pressure in the US from activists such as Jesse Jackson not to race, under threats including strike action by African Americans working in their businesses. Only Jones and team management Teddy Mayer and Carl Haas were aware of this plan. Jones said "And so, on the Saturday morning I was gone. I just didn’t turn up. They had the car out ready to go, when they were told, "AJ’s been struck down by a virus and we are not racing"."

It was the final South African Grand Prix until apartheid ended, with FISA president Jean-Marie Balestre announcing days after the race that the Grand Prix would not return to the nation for 1986 because of apartheid. Even without the political pressures, this might well have been the final Formula One race held at Kyalami in its then form: FISA had long since deemed that circuits where lap times were under 60 seconds were considered too small for Grand Prix racing and with car speeds increasing all the time, it was reasonable to conclude that lap times from  would be under 60 seconds.

The South African Grand Prix would only return in 1992, after apartheid ended, in a new configuration of the Kyalami circuit. Mansell would also win the 1992 race driving a Williams, albeit with a naturally-aspirated Renault engine.

Classification

Qualifying
Pole position went to Nigel Mansell, averaging 236.898 km/h (147.201 mph).

Race

Championship standings after the race

Drivers' Championship standings

Constructors' Championship standings

Note: Only the top five positions are included for both sets of standings. Only the best 11 results counted towards the Drivers' Championship. Numbers without parentheses are Championship points; numbers in parentheses are total points scored.

References

South African Grand Prix
South African Grand Prix
Sport and apartheid in South Africa
Grand Prix, 1985
South African Grand Prix
Politics and sports
Formula One controversies